Avatha subpunctata is a species of moth of the family Erebidae first described by George Thomas Bethune-Baker in 1906. It is found on New Guinea and in Australia, where it has been recorded from Queensland.

The wings have a complex pattern of various shades and hues of brown and patches of black. There is a black-edged white dot at the base the forewings.

References

Moths described in 1906
Avatha
Moths of New Guinea
Moths of Australia